Show It Off is a 2010 music album by British Indian singer Amar.

Track listing

References

2010 albums
Amar (British singer) albums